Don't It Feel Good is a 1975 funk/jazz-funk album by Ramsey Lewis released on Columbia Records.  
The album peaked at No. 3 on the Billboard Top Jazz Albums chart and No. 5 on the Billboard Top Soul Albums chart.

Overview
The single "What's the Name of This Funk (Spider Man)" made its way to number 6 on the Dance Music/Club Play Singles chart.

This album reunited him with former Chess Records producer, Charles Stepney. Bassist Cleveland Eaton had left for a solo career by then and was replaced by Tiaz Palmer.  Also added to the group was former member of The Pharaohs, Derf Reklaw-Raheem on percussion and flute and guitarist Byron Gregory, both of whom appeared as additional musicians on the previous Sun Goddess.

Track list

Credits

Musicians
Byron Gregory – guitar
Morris Jennings – drums, tambourine, bells
Ramsey Lewis – synthesizer, piano, keyboards, clavinet
Brenda Mitchell-Stewart – vocals
Tiaz Palmer – bass
Derf Reklaw-Raheem – flute, conga, tambourine
Paul Serrano – horn
Charles Stepney – synthesizer, Moog synthesizer
Morris Stewart – vocals

Production
Paul Serrano – engineer
Charles Stepney – producer
Ramsey Lewis – producer

Charts

Singles

References

1975 albums
Ramsey Lewis albums
Albums produced by Charles Stepney
Columbia Records albums
Jazz fusion albums by American artists